Chesterfield Royal Hospital NHS Foundation Trust became a NHS Foundation Trust in January 2005, providing health services at the Chesterfield Royal Hospital and at other facilities in Chesterfield, Derbyshire, England.

Performance

In August 2013 inspectors from the Care Quality Commission found some patients were not being treated with respect, nutritional needs were not being met and records were not being completed. They also highlighted a lack of choice of suitable food and drink for patients – and a previous inspection found national standards of nutritional needs were not being met.

The Trust developed a scheme where vulnerable patients could order cost-price 'Home From Hospital' food packs through the discharge lounge which was featured by the BBC in "Operation Hospital Food". "The type of patient that might use these packs doesn't normally have a big appetite - they just need something simple, which is why I suggested the basics - such as bread, cheese, milk and butter. That way they can make themselves a cheese sandwich, cheese on toast, bread and butter, something very easy to have with a cup of tea. The hope is that it will reduce the risk of a patient not eating and drinking properly, one of the potential reasons for early re-admission to hospital. It's not rocket science, but as far as we know, it's not been done anywhere else in the NHS."

Basil Ward is used for patients needing to be moved to other types of care outside acute setting. It is designed for 14 patients but is accommodating 28. Visits by the Clinical Commissioning Group and the trust's governors in 2014 found it to be overcrowded with staffing problems and a failure to report incidents.

In May 2015 after the collapse of the Holywell Medical Group the trust's primary care branch, Royal Primary Care, took over the running of GP services to all patients registered with the practice in Chesterfield and Staveley.  By 2016 it had taken on four practices, with more than 30,000 patients in total.

On 17 May 2017, Chesterfield Royal Hospital was awarded a GOOD rating from the Care Quality Commission.

It won the title of Large Employer of the Year at the East Midlands finals of the National Apprenticeship Awards in 2022.

See also
 List of hospitals in England
 List of NHS trusts

References

External links
 Chesterfield Royal Hospital NHS Foundation Trust

NHS foundation trusts